Û, û (u-circumflex) is a letter of the Latin script.

Usage

Romanization

Romanization from Cyrillic
This letter is used in some standards of Cyrillic transliteration as the letter Ю:
 GOST 16876-71 table 1
 ISO 9 (ISO 9:1986 and ISO 9:1995)

Romanization from Chinese
It is used in Wade-Giles (one of the romanization systems in Chinese) for apical dental unrounded vowel as in tzû, tz'û, ssû, corresponds to present zi, ci, si in Pinyin respectively.

Romanization from Japanese

û represents うう in both Nihon-shiki and Kunrei-shiki romanization systems.

General writing systems

Afrikaans
In Afrikaans, û is a punctuated form of u and a usage example includes "brûe". plural of "brug" (= bridge).

Emilian-Romagnol
Û represents [uː] in Emilian dialects: in the Bolognese dialect, anvûd [aŋˈvuːd] means "nephews".

French
In French, û does not change the pronunciation of the letter u except in jeune "young", which is pronounced differently from jeûne "a fast". In some other words like mû, the circumflex has no disambiguating value; attempts have been made to abolish it in such words. See Circumflex in French. Û also often appears in words that used to have an "s" after the "u": the French word for August, août, used to be written aoust.

Friulian
Û represents the sound .

Italian
Û is occasionally used to represent the sound  in words like fûrono (they were).

Kurdish
Û is used in Kurdish Kurmanji alphabet in the to represent a long close back rounded vowel , and in some dialects, a long close central rounded vowel, .

Polish
In the Masovian dialect, û represents /ju:/.

Turkish
Û indicates palatalization of the preceding consonant: "sükûnet" (quietness) is pronounced .

Welsh
In Welsh, û is used to represent a long stressed u  or  when, without the circumflex, it would be pronounced as a short  or : cytûn  "agreed", bûm  "I was" as opposed to bum  "five" (soft-mutated prenominal form).

Character mappings

See also
 Circumflex

U-circumflex